The 1961 Monaco Grand Prix was a Formula One motor race held on 14 May 1961 on the Circuit de Monaco in Monte Carlo, Monaco. It was race 1 of 8 in both the 1961 World Championship of Drivers and the 1961 International Cup for Formula One Manufacturers. It was also the first World Championship race under the new 1.5 litre engine regulations.

Report

Qualifying 
The erratic yearly variations in Monaco's qualifying regulations saw grid places guaranteed for works teams and past winners in 1961. Therefore, the five works teams were awarded two places each on the grid, while Stirling Moss and Maurice Trintignant earned spots. This left nine drivers to fight over four remaining slots. A fifth opened up when Innes Ireland crashed during the final practice session, breaking his leg. Moss took pole position from Richie Ginther and Jim Clark, with Graham Hill and Phil Hill on the second row.

Race 
Ginther led Clark and Moss into the first corner but Clark quickly ran into trouble with a faulty fuel pump. Ginther dropped to third on lap 14, when Moss and Bonnier passed him in quick succession. At quarter distance, Moss had an impressive 10 second lead (in the underpowered Lotus 18-Climax) but the Ferraris of Hill and then Ginther found their way around Bonnier and began to close the gap. At half distance, Moss' lead was 8 seconds, and down to 3 seconds on lap 60. Ginther moved into second on lap 75 and tried to close the gap, but Moss proved able to match his lap times, despite the 156's horsepower advantage.

Classification

Qualifying 

 Drivers that had to qualify on speed: only the five fastest (four before Ireland's injury) would race.

Race

Championship standings after the race 

Drivers' Championship standings

Constructors' Championship standings

 Notes: Only the top five positions are included for both sets of standings.

References 

Monaco Grand Prix
Monaco Grand Prix
Grand Prix
Monaco Grand Prix